Michel Robida (29 June 1909, Paris – 8 May 1991) was a 20th-century French journalist and writer.

Michel Robida fut laureate of the Prix Femina in 1946 as well as the Prix Narcisse Michaut of the Académie française en 1946 and the Prix Louis-Paul Miller of the sae Académie in 1956.

Work 
 1945: Botemry
 1946: Le Temps de la longue patience Éditions Julliard— Prix Femina
 1948: Chateaubriand
 1951: La Balle et le Lièvre
 1953: Le Haut du pavé
 1955: Ces bourgeois de Paris
 1958: Sourires siciliens
 1958: Le Salon Charpentier et les impressionnistes
 1963: Retour à Coatélan
 1968: Un monde englouti
 1972: L'Enfant sage des années folles

External links 
 Michel Robida on Babelio
 Michel Robida on the site of the Académie française
 À l'exposition Marcel Proust by Marcel Robida on Revue des deux Mondes (July 1971)
 MARIO (Récit) by Marcel Robida on Revue des Deux Mondes (June–July 1974)
 Colette by Marcel Robida on Revue des Deux Mondes (April 1973)

Writers from Paris
1909 births
1991 deaths
20th-century French non-fiction writers
Prix Femina winners